Threefish is a symmetric-key tweakable block cipher designed as part of the Skein hash function, an entry in the NIST hash function competition. Threefish uses no S-boxes or other table lookups in order to avoid cache timing attacks; its nonlinearity comes from alternating additions with exclusive ORs.  In that respect, it is similar to Salsa20, TEA, and the SHA-3 candidates CubeHash and BLAKE.

Threefish and the Skein hash function were designed by Bruce Schneier, Niels Ferguson, Stefan Lucks, Doug Whiting, Mihir Bellare, Tadayoshi Kohno, Jon Callas, and Jesse Walker.

Description of the cipher

Threefish works on words of 64 bits (unsigned Little endian integers).  is the number of plaintext words and also of key words. The tweak consists of two words. All additions and subtractions are defined modulo .

Key schedule 

Threefish encrypts in  rounds and uses  different round keys. After every four rounds, and before the first,  round key words are added to the  data words. To calculate the round keys an additional key word  is appended to the original key words . Also, an additional tweak word  is appended to the tweak words .

The round key words  are now defined like this:

Here , where  is the number of the round in which the round key word  is used.

Mix function 

The mix function takes a tuple of words  and returns another tuple of words . The function is defined like this:

 is a fixed set of rotation constants chosen to achieve quick diffusion.

Permute 
The permutation step swaps the positions of the words according to a constant pattern.
Bit-level permutation is not achieved in this step, but this is not necessary since the MIX functions
provides bit-level permutations in the form of bitwise rotations. The Permute step and rotation constants
in the MIX functions are chosen in such a way that the overall effect is complete diffusion of all the bits
in a data block.

Because this permutation is fixed and independent of the key, the time needed to compute it does not provide 
information about the key or plaintext. This is important because on most modern microprocessors performance 
optimisations can make the time taken to compute an array operation dependent on where the data is stored in memory.
In ciphers where array lookup depends on either the key or plaintext (as is the case for the substitution step in AES),
it can make the cipher vulnerable to timing attacks by examining the time required
for encryption. The permutation is therefore deliberately designed to ensure that it should execute in the same fashion
independent of the key being used or the data encrypted.

A full Threefish round 

 if  the round key  is added to word 
 the mix function is applied to pairs of words, the rotation widths  depend on round number  and word pair 
 the words are permutated using a permutation independent from the round number

Threefish256 and Threefish512 apply this round  times. Threefish1024 applies it 80 times.

Final operations 
After all rounds are applied, the last round key words  are added to the words and the words are converted back to a string of bytes.

Security
In October 2010, an attack that combines rotational cryptanalysis with the rebound attack was published. The attack mounts a known-key distinguisher against 53 of 72 rounds in Threefish-256, and 57 of 72 rounds in Threefish-512. It also affects the Skein hash function. This is a follow-up to the earlier attack published in February, which breaks 39 and 42 rounds respectively. In response to this attack, the Skein team tweaked the rotation constants used in Threefish and thereby the key schedule constants for round 3 of the NIST hash function competition.

In 2009, a related key boomerang attack against a reduced round Threefish version was published.

See also
 Twofish
 Blowfish (cipher)

References

External links
 "The Skein Hash Function Family" Homepage of the Skein Hash Function Family.

Block ciphers
Free ciphers